Jason Smith (born 6 January 1964) is an English former professional snooker player who had a ten year spell on the World Snooker Tour between 1987–88 and 1996-97.

Career
On the first day of his eligibility, his 18th birthday in 1982, Smith was winning league snooker for Mansfield.

Smith reached the last 16 of the 1989 Grand Prix where he was defeated by  world champion and eventual Grand Prix winner Steve Davis. Through the tournament he defeated Tony Meo, Peter Francisco, Jon Wright and Joe O'Boye.

References

Living people
1964 births
English snooker players